Yulin Yuyang Airport  is an airport serving the city of Yulin in Shaanxi Province, China. The airport opened in March 2008, replacing the old Yulin Xisha Airport. Its construction started in 2005 and it was classified as a 4C grade civil regional airport.

Airlines and destinations

See also
List of airports in China
List of the busiest airports in China

References

Airports in Shaanxi
Airports established in 2008
2008 establishments in China
Yulin, Shaanxi